The fat-tailed sheep is a general type of domestic sheep known for their distinctive large tails and hindquarters. Fat-tailed sheep breeds comprise approximately 25% of the world's sheep population, and are commonly found in northern parts of Africa, the Middle East, and various Central Asian countries all the way to China. The tail fat from those sheep is an important ingredient in many regional cuisines.

Varieties and distribution

Two general varieties of fat-tails exist, the broad fat-tails and the long fat-tails. The long-tailed varieties have the smallest geographical distribution, being found mostly in Arabia (a variety called the Nejd, black with a white head, named for the Nejd region, and raised also in Iraq, Central Asia, and Syria) and in the Caucasus (the Colchian, for the Colchis territory, and the Circassian). Broad varieties include the Hajaz (Arabia, small and white, named for the Hejaz region), the Arabi (black or piebald, in Arabia and Iraq), the Awassi (the dominant variety in Iraq, Lebanon, Syria, Palestine, Jordan), and the ak or White Karaman (in Turkey). Eastward, toward Iran (among the Bakhtiari people) and China, there are dozens of varieties, including the Karakul.

Fat-tailed sheep likely moved into Africa through the Horn of Africa, then into Egypt and North Africa, at least by 2000 BC, when they are depicted in Egyptian art. They were the third type of sheep to be brought into Africa.

The majority of fat-tailed sheep breeds have broad fat-tails, where the fat is accumulated in baggy deposits in the hind parts of a sheep on both sides of its tail and on the first 3–5 vertebrae of the tail. Earlier historians including Herodotus report that their tails sometimes were so long that shepherds built miniature carts for them, and that tails sometimes grew so large that it dragged on the ground and hindered copulation. Fat-tailed sheep are well adapted to life in arid landscapes, the fat providing a food reserve for "combatting harsh desert conditions".

The earliest record of fat-tailed sheep is found in ancient Uruk (3000 BC) and Ur (2400 BC) on stone vessels and mosaics. In Sumer, fat-tailed sheep were kept in temples, for wool. Another early reference is found in the Bible (Exodus 29:22 and Leviticus 3:9), where a sacrificial offering is described which includes the tail fat (called Alya, Hebrew: אַלְיָה) of sheep.

Mesopotamian records provide a wealth of information about fat-tailed sheep (udu gukkal or udu-gug-gal); they produced the highest-quality wool and were kept in large numbers. The city state of Lagash, around 2000 BCE, had over 66,000 such sheep.

Afghanistan
A report published in 1915 by Henry D. Baker, American consul in Bombay, indicates how important the fat-tailed sheep was for Afghanistan. The animal's wool, he says, was one of the country's most important export products; in 1912-1913 the country exported (through Balochistan) for over $1.5 million in wool. Frequently fat-tailed sheep were interbred with Indian sheep to produce high-quality wool. In addition, because the fat was used in the way of butter or ghee, Afghans were able to produce a surplus of ghee for export to India. The animal's meat was the Afghan population's main meat source, according to Baker.

Uzbekistan
Uzbek cuisine is high in fat, and tail fat, called qurdiuq or dumba (often from the Karakul breed), is an important supplier of that fat, which is "revere[d] as a semi-sacred object of gastronomical desire", and used in a variety of national dishes, such as laghman and palov. Food scholar Russell Zanca notes that dumba has become scarce in the post-Soviet era. Under Soviet rule Uzbekistan became a huge grower of cotton, and consequently cottonseed oil took over as the major fat used in cooking; still, dumba continues to play an important role in the Uzbek imagination and folklore.

Tail fat

The tail fat is an essential part of many cuisines, including Persian cuisine.

It is called لية (leeyeh,  leyyah, or layeh) in Arabic, zaaka in Algeria,  kuyruk yağı in Turkish, and دنبه (donbe or dombe) in Iran. It emits a strong smell when cooked, though the flavor is described as rich and full. Chunks of it, boiled or roasted, were frequently offered to guests.

Wool from fat-tailed sheep
Records from Mesopotamia show the cultural importance of wool and sheep shearing--or, really, plucking ("rooing"); at this time, sheep had not yet developed the gene that allowed for a continuous growth of wool, and sheep moulted their wool naturally, like dogs and still unrefined breeds of sheep. The plucking was likely performed with flint scrapers from stone. Wool was the most commonly used material for textile manufacture, and the month in which sheep were plucked was named for the plucking shed. Wool quality was ranked in five categories, and wool from fat-tailed sheep (udu gukkal) was ranked the highest, in the first and second categories. Daniel Potts estimates each sheep might have provided 0.7 kg or more of wool. In comparison, 20th-c sheep in Iraq and Turkey yielded up to 1.59 kg per animal.

Breeds

 Adal sheep
 Afghan Arabi
 Afrikaner
 Alai sheep
 Altay sheep
 Arabi sheep
 Armenian Semicoarsewool
 Awassi
 Balkhi
 Blackhead Persian
 Chios
 Damara
 Edilbay
 Karakul
 Laticauda
 Meatmaster
 Mongolian breeds: Khalkh, Baidrag etc. 
 Pedi
 Red Maasai
 Somali
 Tunis
 Tunisian Barbarin
 Waziri
 Van Rooy sheep
 Zulu, or Nguni

References

External links

Sheep breeds